The Freedom Committees (officially, in Latin, Comitatus pro libertatibus; in Italian Comitati per le Libertà) are a transnational association dedicated to the diffusion of the principles of liberalism and libertarianism.

Story 

The "Committees for Freedoms" were founded in 1997 on the initiative of the Russian writer Vladimir Bukovsky, the French historian Stéphane Courtois and the Italian writer and journalist Dario Fertilio as a federally-based international movement to defend and spread the culture of freedoms.

In the early years, the committees worked for the organization of various conferences, for example on October, 13th 1997 in honor of Edgardo Sogno in Turin.

In 2001 the General Assembly held in Florence elected Vladimir Bukovsky as President-General of the Committees. Another assembly took place in Rome from March, 1st to March, 3rd 2003.

Memento Gulag 
The Committees for Freedoms organized every year "Memento Gulag", a day of international studies on the repression and crimes of communist regimes, in particular Soviet totalitarianism. The workshop is always held on the same date, chosen for its symbolic value: November 7, the day of the beginning of the October Revolution according to the Gregorian calendar.

Starting in 2003 the international workshop was held in various European towns:
 2003: in Rome, 7-8 November;

2004: in Bucharest (in cooperation with the Memorial of the Victims of Communism and of the Resistance);

2005: in Berlin (in cooperation with the Istituto Italiano di Cultura of Berlin, the Gedenkstätte Berlin-Hohenschönhausen and the Konrad-Adenauer-Stiftung);
2006: in La Roche-sur-Yon (Vendée) (dedicated to the victims of the 1956 Hungarian counter-revolution);
2007: in Paris;
2008 in Milan;
2009 in Trieste;
2010 in Bologna;

The workshop showed the presence of the President of the Italian Senate Marcello Pera (on two occasion) and the President of the German (Bundestag) Norbert Lammert, of the former E.U. Commissioner and former Foreign Minister of Latvia Sandra Kalniete and of the President of Moldova Mihai Ghimpu.

In 2017 Dario Fertilio complained the limited interest to the event in recent years. In 2019, right after the death of Bukovskij, the themes of the workshop were reprised again on a conference on November 7 at the Senato della Repubblica organized under the patronage of Italian center-right MPs.

References

Bibliography

See also 
 Gulag
 Stalinism
 Vladimir Konstantinovič Bukovskij
 Stéphane Courtois
 Council of Europe resolution 1481

External links

Official speeches
2003 Marcello Pera, Il gulag e la logica totalitaria, Roma, Memento Gulag 2003
2005 Marcello Pera, Memento Gulag. Memento oggi., Berlino, Memento Gulag 2005

Commemoration of communist crimes
Organizations established in 1997